Glamorous Night is a musical with a book and music by Ivor Novello and lyrics by Christopher Hassall, Novello's collaborator in six of the eight Novello musicals staged between 1935 and 1951.  Glamorous Night was the first of several Novello musicals in the 1930s given an expensive, spectacular production, with several scene changes and a large cast, including many extras and dancers.  Scenes included villas on a suburban street where a horse-drawn carriage was driven, the set of an operetta performed in the fictional country of Krasnia, shipboard skating and assassination scenes, the sinking of the ship, a bustling gypsy wedding and a Royal ballroom.

The musical was first performed in London in 1935. In 1937 it was adapted as a film of the same name starring Mary Ellis and Otto Kruger.

Productions 
Glamorous Night was produced by Ivor Novello.  The musical opened at the Theatre Royal, Drury Lane in London on 2 May 1935 to robust ticket sales, but had a limited run due to the pre-booking of a pantomime at the theatre. It then toured in the British provinces before re-opening at the London Coliseum in May 1936 for another short run, for a total of 234 London performances.  The role of Anthony Allen was played by Novello, and that of the gypsy (Militza Hajos) was played by Mary Ellis.  It was directed by Leontine Sagan, with choreography by Ralph Reader.  The plot echoed current events in Rumania, where the king was willing to give up his reign to marry a Romany actress, Mme. Lupesco.

A movie was made of Glamorous Night in 1937, with Barry MacKay taking the role of Anthony Allen, Otto Kruger as King Stephen and Mary Ellis reprising her stage role of Militza.

The show was briefly revived in November 1975 at the New London Theatre, and was part of a UK tour.  It was directed by Alexander Bridge and starred John Hanson and Pamela Field.

Synopsis
A young inventor, Anthony Allen, has created a working television.  The head of a radio broadcasting company fears competition and pays Allen to suppress his invention.  Allen journeys to the "Ruritanian" kingdom of Krasnia in Central Europe.  There he meets a gypsy princess, Militza, but she is betrothed to the King of Krasnia.  Allen saves her life in a shipwreck and soon falls in love with her.  But  brokenhearted, he gives her up, for the good of the kingdom.  Meanwhile, the gypsies side with the King to overcome a revolution.  Back in England, Allen watches the king's wedding to Militza on his television.

Principal characters 
  Anthony Allen, an inventor – Novello, and later Barry Sinclair
  Militza Hajos, a Gypsy princess – Mary Ellis 
  Phoebe, her maid – Minnie Rayner
  Stephen, King of Krasnia – Barry Jones
  Nico, a footman – Peter Graves

Replacements included Robert Andrews, Olive Gilbert, Elisabeth Welch and Muriel Barron.

Musical numbers 
  Glamorous Night
  Fold your wings
  Shine through my Dreams
  When a Gypsy Played
  Far Away in Shanty Town
  Why Isn't It You?
  The Girl I Knew

References 
 Guinness Who's Who of Stage Musicals, Colin Larkin (ed), Guinness Publications. 
 Lowe, Leslie.  Directory of Popular Music, Music Master.

Further reading
 Slattery-Christy, David. In Search of Ruritania: The Life and Times of Ivor Novello, Authorhouse/Penguin, 2006

Notes

External links
Glamorous Night at the Guide to Musical Theatre
Television on the West End Stage in 1935

1935 musicals
West End musicals
Musicals by Ivor Novello
Fictional representations of Romani people
British musicals